The New Casper Cartoon Show is a 1963-1970 animated television series that appeared on ABC's Saturday morning schedule, based on the Harvey Comics cartoon character Casper the Friendly Ghost. Casper's co-stars included his friends from the Harvey Comics stories: Wendy the Good Little Witch, the Ghostly Trio, Spooky the Tuff Little Ghost, and the ghost horse Nightmare. The show premiered on October 5, 1963 and is one of the earliest Saturday morning cartoons.

The show included a mix of 26 new Casper cartoons created for this show by Paramount Cartoon Studios, as well as a selection of 1959—62 cartoons from the aforementioned Paramount, which were mostly the later Modern Madcaps and Noveltoons which were repackaged as "Modern Madcaps". All voices in the Casper episodes were performed by Norma MacMillan and Bradley Bolke.

All of the new material was created for the first season in 1963-1964, but the show continued airing in reruns on ABC for six seasons, ending on January 30, 1970.

Episodes
All directed by Seymour Kneitel, and all with music by Winston Sharples and graphic arts by Warren Kremer.

Home media
On October 11, 2011, Shout! Factory released Casper the Friendly Ghost: The Complete Collection 1945–1963 on DVD in Region 1.  The 3-disc set features 55 original theatrical cartoons as well as all 26 episodes from The New Casper Cartoon Show on DVD.

See also
 List of ghost films

References

External links
 

Casper the Friendly Ghost
American Broadcasting Company original programming
1960s American animated television series
1963 American television series debuts
1970 American television series endings
English-language television shows
Animated television series about ghosts
Television series by Universal Television
Television series by CBS Studios
American children's animated horror television series
Television series by Famous Studios
Television series about size change